Vipin Kumar Khanna (14 December 1930 – 7 November 2019) was an Indian business magnate and a retired officer of the Indian Army. Khanna had diverse business interests. He founded Dynamic Sales Service International, a commodities trading and marketing company which further expanded into the fast-moving consumer goods, engineering support, shipbroking and additional sectors as well. Khanna also had other business interests, which included interests in the arms, aerospace, software, investment banking, hospitality, real estate, alcohol and drinks industries. He was a Non-Resident Indian based in London, England, and also had a base in Delhi, India. 

Khanna was born in Lahore, Punjab Province. During the partition of India, Khanna and his family fled Lahore, and migrated to Delhi. He was commissioned into the Indian Army in 1950, and eventually reached the rank of Major, before voluntarily retiring from the army in 1965. After his retirement from the army, Khanna became a businessman.  

Khanna had a long and controversial business career. His name appeared in various controversies regarding allegations of being an arms dealer, links to numerous offshore companies and allegedly being involved in bribery scandals, however, the investigations into him found no evidence of wrongdoing and were dropped. Khanna was allegedly one of the largest and most powerful arms dealers in India since the 1980s, however, the allegations levelled against him were never proven and the cases against him were dropped. Despite the lack of evidence against Khanna, allegations of being an arms dealer, being linked to foreign defence companies and allegations of being involved in various arms deals in India persisted throughout his business career. He was noted by Indian intelligence agencies for being a powerful and influential person, both in India and globally.

Khanna died on 7 November 2019, in New Delhi. His business interests were divided between his children: Vinita, Navin, Arvind and Aditya.

Early life and military career 

Vipin Kumar Khanna was born on 14 December 1930 in Lahore, Punjab Province, British India. Khanna was the son of Shanti Lal Khanna. He was born into a Punjabi Hindu family. Khanna, along with his family, fled Lahore during the partition of India, and migrated to Delhi, India. He was from a wealthy family in Lahore, but the family lost their wealth when they fled the city during the partition, and had to start anew after migrating to Delhi. 

In 1950, Khanna was commissioned into the Indian Army after graduating from the National Defence Academy, which at the time was known as the Joint Services Wing, and was part of the Indian Military Academy, in Dehradun. He was commissioned into the Brigade of the Guards. During his service in the army, Khanna was part of the Indian contingent of the United Nations Emergency Force (UNEF), which was formed in the aftermath of the Suez Crisis, and was deployed to Egypt. 

During his time in the UNEF, Khanna was aide-de-camp to Lieutenant general E. L. M. Burns, who was the first Force Commander of the UNEF. While serving with the United Nations, he traveled extensively to foreign countries, which included those that had contributed to the UNEF and other countries as well. Khanna built friendships and made contacts with prominent people during his travels, and these relationships later helped Khanna develop his international connections when he started his business career.

When he returned to India, Khanna became an instructor at the College of Combat, Mhow, which is now known as the Army War College, Mhow, for three years. Khanna eventually rose to the rank of Major, however, he voluntarily retired from the Indian Army in 1965. His retirement came into effect on 17 July 1965. Khanna stated that his reasons for seeking premature retirement were that he saw no future prospects for himself within the army and that he had domestic concerns. After retiring from the army, Khanna began his business career.

Business career 
Khanna started his business career after voluntarily retiring from the Indian Army in 1965. His initial business interests were in the import and export of various goods and products. These included importing brass strips, bronze wires, speciality steel products, machinery, machine tools, taper roller bearings and oils, and exporting semi-precious stones, silver jewellery and textiles.

Dynamic Sales Service International 

In 1967, Khanna founded Dynamic Sales Service International (DSSI), which was a diverse commodities trading and marketing company. In 1971, the company started importing newsprint from Canada to India. In the 1970s, Khanna, through his company DSSI, also developed business relations with companies in the United States. Officials from the U.S Embassy in New Delhi and representatives from both the United States Department of Commerce and the United States Department of State would regularly meet and communicate with him as well. Also during the 1970s, Khanna developed connections within the Government of India and the Indian Bureaucracy. This included connections with then Prime Minister Indira Gandhi, members of various cabinet committees and the executives of public sector undertakings (PSUs). 

DSSI's commodities trading and marketing business expanded to include the metals and mining, agricultural commodities, steel, coal, fertilizers, and oil and gas industries. The company facilitated the import of commodities from foreign multinational companies, among which were BHP, Cargill and Mobil, before its merger with Exxon. These imports were for PSUs, among which were Indian Oil Corporation, Bharat Petroleum Corporation and Mangalore Refinery and Petrochemicals. DSSI also facilitated both the import and export of commodities for companies which included Louis Dreyfus, Tate & Lyle, National Aluminium Company, Steel Authority of India, MMTC and Rashtriya Ispat Nigam.  

DSSI further expanded into the engineering support sector. The company's engineering support division constructed a power plant for National Fertilizer's Bhatinda and Panipat facilities, and did considerable work with Indian Railways and the Airports Authority of India as well. DSSI's engineering support division also collaborated with Engineers India to introduce India's first subsea production system for Oil & Natural Gas Corporation. The company entered the shipbroking sector as well. 

In 1990, DSSI established DSSI Exports. DSSI Exports entered the fast-moving consumer goods (FMCG) sector and launched Chelsea, which was a tea brand. Chelsea's tea products were sold in the United States and the United Kingdom. From 1991 to 1998, DSSI Exports was the franchisee for Capelli Sport in India. In the 1990s, the company also manufactured and exported textiles.

By 2002, DSSI was a diversified business group, and the company's annual sales exceeded $800 million. DSSI also had an office in London, and Khanna's youngest child, Aditya Khanna, led DSSI's international business operations. DSSI also established DSSI Foods, and further expanded in the FMCG sector. DSSI Foods was initially started as a brand under DSSI Exports before being set up as a company in 2004. The company sold tea products, roasted coffee beans, spices and cashews.

Other Indian businesses  
Khanna further expanded his business interests to other industries in India. In the 1980s, Khanna entered the arms and aerospace industries. In 1997, Khanna entered the drinks and alcohol industries through his company Clan Morgan, which was based in Alwar, Rajasthan. The company had its distilleries and bottling plants located in Rajasthan. Clan Morgan also had a joint venture with Allied Domecq, and initially owned 50% of the joint venture. The joint venture was called Allied Domecq Spirit & Wine India. The joint venture introduced and established the whiskey brands, Teacher's and Old Smuggler in the Indian market. The company also bottled Allied Domecq's other international brands. Later, Allied Domecq increased their  shareholding in the joint venture to 74%, and in 2005, bought out Clan Morgan's 26% share in Allied Domecq Spirit & Wine India.

In 2009, Khanna founded V4 Security Service in Delhi. V4 Security Service marketed cybersecurity, surveillance technology, digital forensics and systems integration products from both international and Indian technology companies. The company's clients included Indian intelligence agencies and the Indian Police Service. In 2013, V4 Security Service partnered with Falck, a Danish emergency services company and private ambulance operator, to provide professional ambulance, roadside assistance, disaster management, travel and safety services.

Foreign business interests and international connections 
Khanna also had foreign business interests. He had interests in the real estate and hotel industries in the UK. In 1995, Khanna and Aditya founded Tamarind, a restaurant in London that became of part of their restaurant group, the Tamarind Collection. Tamarind is an Indian restaurant in Mayfair, and in 2001, became the first Indian restaurant to win a Michelin star in the UK. Khanna and Aditya also opened Imli, an Indian restaurant in Soho, London, which was rebranded as Tamarind Kitchen in 2017. In 2013, the Tamarind Collection acquired Zaika, an Indian restaurant in Kensington. Khanna and Aditya also expanded into investment banking and founded FiNoble Advisors. FiNoble Advisors was an investment bank that had offices in New York, London and New Delhi. The investment bank focused on international middle-market companies and financial institutions that were trying to enter the Indian market, and provided mergers and acquisitions advice to Indian companies that were looking for acquisitions in the United States and Europe.

During his business career, Khanna developed international connections, which included connections with foreign dignitaries and diplomats. In 1985, during a visit to India, United States Senator Richard Lugar met with Khanna, and other prominent Indian figures, to examine U.S foreign policy in India and South Asia. From 1996 to 2005, he served as the Honorary Consul of the Grand Duchy of Luxembourg in New Delhi. During his tenure as Honorary Consul, Khanna supported the idea that India would benefit if Luxembourg established banks in the country. He would also entertain foreign dignitaries in his homes in Delhi. In 2006, during an investigation into Khanna, the Indian Government at the time claimed that his international reach was powerful enough to influence investigative agencies around the world.

Controversies

Arms dealer allegations 
Khanna and his family are allegedly one of the biggest and most powerful arms dealers in India. Khanna was allegedly one of the three largest arms dealers in India, along with Sudhir Choudhrie and Suresh Nanda. In 2006, the Central Bureau of Investigation (CBI) claimed that the Khanna family, the Nanda family and the Choudhrie family had been controlling business in the defence industry of India even prior to the Bofors Scandal in the 1980s, and allegedly, their commissions from defence deals could be as much as 15%. Until the Bofors Scandal in the 1980s, lobbying for arms deals was legal, however, the political fallout from the scandal caused the Indian Government in 1987 to ban the use of agents in the defence industry. Before the ban, the Ministry of Defence kept a list of arms agents that was reviewed annually, and Khanna's name would appear on the list every year. In 2012, the Enforcment Directorate (ED) claimed that Khanna and his family's network in the Indian defence industry has grown more powerful since the Bofors Scandal. 

Khanna was allegedly a major figure in the defence industry of India and reportedly played an instrumental role in influencing the approval of defence deals. Allegedly, Khanna could guide deals through the defence procurement processes due to his connections within the Indian Bureaucracy and his alleged ability to pay large commissions to various politicians, active and retired military officials, and bureaucrats that are involved in the procurement processes. Khanna was allegedly linked to various foreign defence companies and was allegedly involved in various arms deals in India. However, the allegations levelled against him were never proven, and the investigations and cases against Khanna were dropped.

Allegations of links to foreign defence companies 
In 1986, officials from the Ministry of Finance conducted an investigation into Khanna for allegedly being an arms agent for Saab, a Swedish defence and aerospace company. However, the officials from the ministry later dropped the investigation into him. In 1987, Khanna was once again investigated by the Ministry of Finance for his alleged links to Saab, however, before the investigation could progress further, the officer in charge of the investigation was transferred. In 1999, it was alleged that Khanna was the arms agent for Thompson-CSF, a French defence, aerospace and electronics company, which was rebranded as Thales Group in 2000.

In 2001, Khanna's name appeared in Operation West End, a sting operation that was organised and carried out by Tehelka, an Indian news magazine. During the sting operation, Tehelka met Lieutenant Colonel V.K Berry, a retired Indian Army officer, and had discussions with him about middlemen in the Indian defence industry. Berry claimed that Khanna was allegedly the arms agent for several Israeli defence companies, among which were Elbit Systems, Elisra, Tadiran Communications and Symtech. In 2005, Elbit Systems took over Elisra and Tadiran Communications, and in 2008, Tadiran Communication was merged into Elbit systems, and in 2011, Elisra became a wholly owned subsidiary of Elbit. Berry also claimed that he had worked for Khanna for 3 years and had met these companies during that time. Berry made a further claim that Khanna facilitated a deal in which Tadiran Communications supplied communications equipment to the Indian Cabinet Secretariat, and that Khanna received a 12% commission for facilitating the deal. However, Berry later stated that what he had said regarding the communications equipment deal was untrue, and Khanna, under oath, denied that Berry had ever worked for him.

Allegations of involvement in arms deals 
In 2005, Khanna was accused for allegedly facilitating the arms deal that involved the sale of 1,200 anti-material rifles from Denel, a South African aerospace and defence company, to the Indian Army. The anti-material rifles deal between Denel and India was completed in 2003. The CBI and the ED claimed that Khanna allegedly used Varas Associates, an offshore company with offices in the Isle of Man and Berne, Switzerland, to receive a commission of 12.75% for securing the order for Denel. The CBI also claimed that Khanna allegedly influenced the Price Negotiation Committee of the Ministry of Defence. The CBI and ED eventually dropped the case against Khanna due to lack of evidence.

In 2007, Khanna was accused by the CBI for being involved in the Barak Missile scandal. In 2000, the Indian Navy signed a contract to purchase seven Barak anti-missile defence systems and 200 Barak missiles from Israel Aerospace Industries (IAI), an Israeli defence and aerospace company. The allegations of corruption in the missile deal caused the Barak Missile scandal. During the investigations into the scandal, the CBI filed a chargesheet on Khanna in 2007 for allegedly receiving vast kickbacks for securing the contract for Israel, and the CBI also confiscated his passport. The CBI stated that Khanna is a very influential and highly connected person, who is powerful both in India and internationally. The CBI further claimed that due to these reasons, releasing Khanna's passport would adversely impact the investigation into him. It was also alleged by the CBI that Khanna routed his payments from the deal through his various businesses and companies based in Mauritius. The case against Khanna was eventually dropped due to lack of evidence.

In 2016, the CBI launched a probe into the purchase of three Airborne Early Warning and Control (AEW&C) aircraft from Embraer, a Brazilian aerospace manufacturer. Khanna was accused of swinging the aircraft deal, which was signed in 2008, in favour of Embraer by influencing the Indian Airforce and the Defence Research Development Organization (DRDO). The first information report (FIR) filed by the CBI mentioned that Khanna used an offshore company named Interdev Aviation Services Pte Ltd, located in Singapore, to channel the payments from Embraer into India. Allegedly, the payments were also routed through Austria and Switzerland.

Alleged links to offshore companies 
Between 2006 and 2007, Khanna was connected by the CBI and ED to a network of offshore companies based in London, the Channel Islands and the Isle of Man. The CBI and ED claimed that Khanna owned numerous offshore companies, and was allegedly disguising and routing his vast commissions from defence deals through these offshore companies. Khanna denied any links to all offshore companies and financial transactions, and Gopal Subramaniam, an Additional Solicitor General of India, stated to the Supreme Court of India that both the CBI and the ED had found no material evidence linking Khanna to offshore companies and the transactions. In 2007, the CBI claimed that Khanna owned or had business interests in various companies in the UK and other countries. The CBI eventually dropped the case against Khanna due to lack of evidence.

Securency bribery scandal 
In 2007, the Reserve Bank of Australia subsidiary, Securency was involved in bribing overseas officials so that Australia could win lucrative polymer banknote printing contracts. It was reported that David Twine, who was at the time Austrade's Asia regional director and one of Australia's senior most foreign trade promotion officials, met with Khanna to discuss work for Securency and to help the company secure government related contracts. The investigation into Securency was Australia's largest foreign bribery scandal and investigation.

Personal life 
Khanna was married to Naginder Kumari, daughter of Maharaja Bhupinder Singh of Patiala. Khanna and Naginder had four children: Vinita, Navin, Arvind and Aditya.
 Vinita is a businesswoman. Vinita took control Khanna's business interests in software through Khanna's company, V4 Security Service. She is married to Randhir Singh, who is a former Olympic-level shooter, former International Olympic Committee member and sports administrator. 
 Navin is a businessman. Navin took control of Khanna's business interests in commodities trading and marketing, and Khanna's other DSSI group companies. He has also been a noted polo player in India.
 Arvind is a politician, business magnate and philanthropist. He is a member of the Bharatiya Janata Party and has been elected twice to the Punjab Legislative Assembly. Arvind took control of Khanna's business interests in the arms and aerospace industries. Arvind is the founder of Umeed Foundation, an NGO in Punjab.
 Aditya is an entrepreneur and investor. He is a Non-Resident Indian (NRI) based in London, and took control of Khanna's London business interests in hospitality, investment banking and DSSI's London operations. Aditya has founded and invested in businesses in various different industries.
Naginder was also the paternal aunt of Amarinder Singh, former Chief Minister of Punjab. Naginder died in 2012, at the age of 75, in New Delhi.

Khanna was a NRI who was based in London and he also had a base in New Delhi.

Death 
Khanna died on 7 November 2019, at the age of 88, in New Delhi.

References 

1930 births
2019 deaths
Businesspeople from Delhi
Defence industry of India
Arms traders
Corruption in defence procurement in India
Indian aviation businesspeople
Indian commodities traders
Businesspeople in software
Indian restaurateurs
Indian investment bankers
Drink distillers
Khanna family
Punjabi Hindus
Indian Army officers
Indian Army personnel
Academic staff of Army War College, Mhow